The 2010 UEFA Women's Under-17 Championship football tournament took place between 8 April and 26 June. Germany was the defending champion. Spain won the final on penalties 4–1 against the Republic of Ireland.

Spain, Ireland and third placed Germany qualified to the 2010 FIFA U-17 Women's World Cup.

Qualification

First qualifying round

Group 1

Group 2

Group 3

Group 4

Group 5

Group 6

Group 7

Group 8

Group 9

Group 10

Ranking of second-placed teams
To determine the best six runner-up teams from the first qualifying round, only the results against the first and the third teams in each group were taken into account.

Second qualifying round
The host nations of the four one-venue mini-tournament groups are indicated in italics.

Group 1

Group 2

Group 3

Group 4

Final tournament

The winners of the two semifinal matches qualified directly to the 2010 FIFA U-17 Women's World Cup held in Trinidad and Tobago. The losers of the semifinal matches contested in a third-place match to determine who receives the last qualifying spot for the 2010 World Cup.

Semifinals

Third place match

Final

External links
Official Site
Regulations of the UEFA European Women's Under-17 Championship 2009/10
RSSSF – results

2010
women's
2009–10 in Swiss football
International women's association football competitions hosted by Switzerland
UEFA
2010 in youth sport
June 2010 sports events in Europe
2010 in youth association football